David Klein is an American businessman. He is currently the CEO of Canopy Growth and a member of the company's executive management committee.

Education and career
Klein received a bachelor's degree in economics at the State University of New York at Geneseo and his MBA from SUNY Buffalo. In 2004, Klein joined Constellation brands as vice president of business development. He also held roles as CFO of Constellation Europe; SVP, treasurer & controller; and CFO, Beer Division. He was named CFO of Constellation Brands in June 2015.

References

American chief financial officers
Living people
21st-century American businesspeople
Year of birth missing (living people)
University at Buffalo alumni